Twilight is the reissued version of the 1998 album The Race of a Thousand Camels by English rock band Bôa, released on 21 March 2001. During the recording of this album, the band consisted of Alex Caird, Ben Henderson, Jasmine Rodgers, Steve Rodgers, Lee Sullivan, and Paul Turrell.

The first track, "Duvet", became popular after being used as the opening theme song of the anime series Serial Experiments Lain.

Track listing

Personnel
 Alex Caird – bass guitar
 Ben Henderson – electric and acoustic guitar, saxophone, percussion
 Jasmine Rodgers – lead vocals, acoustic guitar, percussion
 Steve Rodgers – electric and acoustic guitar, vocals
 Lee Sullivan – drums, percussion, keyboard
 Paul Turrell – keyboard, string arrangements, percussion, electric guitar

References

2001 albums
Bôa albums